Erinome, also known as , is a retrograde irregular satellite of Jupiter. It was discovered by a team of astronomers from the University of Hawaii led by Scott S. Sheppard in 2000, and given the temporary designation .

Erinome is about 3 kilometres in diameter, and orbits Jupiter at an average distance of 22,986,000 km in 682.80 days, at an inclination of 164° to the ecliptic (162° to Jupiter's equator), in a retrograde direction and with an eccentricity of 0.2552.

It belongs to the Carme group, made up of irregular retrograde moons orbiting Jupiter at a distance ranging between 23 and 24 Gm and at an inclination of about 165°.

Name
Erinome was named in October 2002 after the mythological Erinoma, a Cypriot woman said by the discovery group to be a "daughter of Celes, compelled by Venus to fall in love with Jupiter." (However, it was Jupiter whom Venus made fall in love with Erinoma, in order to ruin her.) 

The final -a vowel of the name was changed to -e to accord with IAU naming conventions for retrograde moons.
The story is only known in Latin, and manuscripts have the name as Erinoma, Erinona and Erittoma. The original Greek name, and thus the stressed syllable in Latin, is unknown. It might be a late corruption of Eurynome, in which case the stress would be on the third syllable (?). Since there is no moon named 'Eurynome' , this would not be ambiguous.

References

Carme group
Moons of Jupiter
Irregular satellites
Discoveries by Scott S. Sheppard
Discoveries by David C. Jewitt
Discoveries by Yanga R. Fernandez
Discoveries by Eugene A. Magnier
20001123
Moons with a retrograde orbit